The 1929 World Table Tennis Championships women's doubles was the second edition of the women's doubles championship. 

Mona Rüster and Erika Metzger defeated Fanchette Flamm and Gertrude Wildam in the final by three sets to nil.

Results

See also
List of World Table Tennis Championships medalists

References

-
_